Avasarala is a name and may refer to:

 Avasarala Ramakrishna Rao (1931–2011), Telugu short story writer
 Avasarala Rao (born 1959), Indian cricketer
 Chrisjen Avasarala, character from the novel and TV series The Expanse
 Srinivas Avasarala (born 1984), Indian film director